Phalanta madagascariensis is a butterfly in the family Nymphalidae. It is found on Madagascar. The habitat consists of forests.

References

Vagrantini
Butterflies described in 1887
Butterflies of Africa
Taxa named by Paul Mabille